is a video game that was released in Japan in September 2003 and March 2004 in North America for the GameCube. It was developed and published by Marvelous Interactive, and is part of the long-running Story of Seasons series of video games. The GameCube version offers connectivity with the Game Boy Advance game, Harvest Moon: Friends of Mineral Town. 
 
A special edition version titled "A Wonderful Life Special Edition" was released on the PlayStation 2 in Japan in 2004 and North America in 2005. It was later re-released on the PlayStation 3 and PlayStation 4 with improvements upon lag issues rooting from the PlayStation 2 port. Harvest Moon: Another Wonderful Life, the girl version of Harvest Moon: A Wonderful Life, was released for the GameCube outside Japan in July 2005.

A remake, titled Story of Seasons: A Wonderful Life, will be released for the Nintendo Switch, PlayStation 5, Xbox Series X and S, and Microsoft Windows in summer 2023.

Gameplay
The player starts the game with one cow, and can later acquire additional, higher-quality cattle as well as sheep, chickens, and a horse. The cow will stop producing milk after 40 days, and will have to be impregnated for her to continue making milk. In addition to these traditional Harvest Moon animals, this is the first game in the series to feature ducks and a goat.

The player starts the game with a dog, and has the choice of floppy or pointed ears. Later in the game, the player may receive a cat from Romana. Seen in the wilderness are a tanuki, a lizard, and a turtle, as well as a chihuahua that appears to be a pet at the dig site.

Also notable is the Mukumuku, who resembles an abominable snowman. The Mukumuku can only be seen during Winter near the tree in which the Harvest Sprites live, and the surrounding area commonly referred to as "the forest."

The player's farm has three fields, with varying levels of fertility. Plants must be watered more than once per day and nourished with fertilizer to obtain high-quality fruits and vegetables. Each crop has its ideal growing season, and will do poorly if planted at the wrong time of year. To obtain the highest quality crops and seeds, the player must water and fertilize the crops every day.

The game offers a variety of crops and trees, and offers the ability to create hybrid crops. The player can do this by feeding any two different seeds or crops to a talking plant, Tartan, who appears after befriending Takakura and visiting him in the morning, from Chapter 2 onwards.

This is the first Harvest Moon game in which the player not only has a child after marriage, but the child ages to adulthood as well. The player's son will look similar to their wife, and have a unique set of interests and talents. The child's developing personality may be influenced by taking him places, introducing him to people, and giving him gifts related to various fields. At the end of the game, the (now adult) son will choose one of seven possible careers: farmer, rancher, musician, artist, scholar, athlete, or scientist. If he becomes a farmer or a rancher, he will take over the family farm, although he can not marry.

The game can also end early if certain actions are taken, such not marrying by the end of Chapter 1 or causing the player's wife to divorce.

Connectivity
If the player connects a Game Boy Advance with Harvest Moon: Friends of Mineral Town or Harvest Moon: More Friends of Mineral Town to the GameCube while playing A Wonderful Life, the two games can exchange information. Initiating the connection requires going to the mountain path next to the vegetable farm where Celia lives in A Wonderful Life, and throwing an offering into the Harvest Goddess' pond in Friends of Mineral Town. Non-player characters (NPCs) in Forget-Me-Not Valley will begin to make comments about events in Mineral Town, and vice versa. In addition, some NPCs will make periodic trips to Mineral Town, returning with new items to sell or hints for the player.

Plot

Opening Scene
When the player begins the game, they see a coastline in Forget-Me-Not valley. Takakura, an old man who used to be the protagonist's father's best friend, is speaking (or thinking) to his father, stating: "He wasn't unhappy. But he didn't seem to have a direction in life. One day, I went to see him. I told him about the farm you left to him. Your son didn't seem to know much about farming, but he was willing to give it a try. So I brought him to Forget-Me-Not-Valley.". The protagonist is then seen walking down the village with Takakura, and he explains how he and the protagonist's father owned the farm. He then shows the protagonist the barn, the tool shed, the chicken coop, the food storage, the protagonist's house, and his house. Soon, two dogs will appear and the protagonist chooses one to keep while Takakura attempts to find an owner for the other one. Takakura agrees to show the protagonist around the valley and introduce him to the villagers: Tim, the owner of the Inner Inn, his wife Ruby, and their son Rock; Nami, a girl staying at the Inner Inn, Wally, an athlete, his wife Chris, and their son Hugh; Galen and his wife Nina; Griffin, the owner of the Blue Bar and his daughter Muffy; Romana, her granddaughter Lumina, and their butler Sebastian; Vesta, a farmer, her brother Marlin, and their helper Celia; Kassey and Patrick, pyrotechnic twins who create fireworks; Cody, an artist; Daryl, a scientist; Gustafa, a musician; and Carter, a scholar, and his assistant Flora. Celia, Nami, and Muffy are the eligible bachelorettes (in Harvest Moon: A Wonderful Life Special Edition, Lumina is also a bachelorette). Additional characters include a doctor named Dr. Hardy, a salesman named Van, and a homeless guy named Murray. Afterwards, the protagonist meets the Harvest Sprites: Nic, Nak, and Flak.

Story
The Beginning
In this chapter, lasting a year, the protagonist begins in his house at 5 AM. The player is now in control of the game, and starts with a cow, a milker, two records, a hoe, a sickle, a watering can, two tomato seeds, and 3000G. The Lodger in the food storage can be used to purchase more tools, animals, and buildings, or to sell animals. Sometime in this chapter, the protagonist will receive a horse from Takakura for free if he is befriended and a rare blue feather from the Harvest Sprites, which can be used to propose to one of the bachelorettes at the very end of the year. Heart Events can be triggered by wooing the bachelorettes. The Seed Maker may be obtained either by befriending Daryl or purchasing it using the Lodger. New tools can be obtained from people if they are befriended such as a wool clipper from Wally, a watering can from Romana, two hoes from Tim and Vesta, and a sickle from Gustafa. A fishing pole and brush can be bought from Van. The protagonist may have a chance to meet Mukumuku, a creature that only appears in the winter. Throughout the story, Daryl attempts to capture Mukumuku, but is constantly thwarted by Murray and potentially Van. There are also side quests to do such as unearthing things at the dig site (if you find any tablets, then Carter gets to keep them) and giving Murray the money he needs to go home. If Murray is given enough money, he will reward you. Additional events can be triggered such as engaging in a conversation with Lumina while she's practicing piano or observing Daryl conduct an experiment that will suddenly backfire. The protagonist must marry one of the bachelorettes in this chapter, or he must leave the town and lead to the game's end. Celia is the easiest bachelorette to woo while Nami is the hardest. Celia will propose to the protagonist should he not successfully woo any of the bachelorettes. Refusing this proposal will also cause the game to end.

Happy Birthday
In this chapter, lasting two years, the protagonist has a son whose personality depends on his mother. The protagonist's house will now have a kitchen and dining room, and will also gain a refrigerator and two bathrooms. The main room now has an additional bed and a toy box containing a sketch pad. The dig site also gets bigger. Some characters' appearances has changed and new people (consisting of Kate, Grant, Samantha, and Dr. Hardy) move in. An additional house is now in the village. If the protagonist does not marry Nami, she will leave town. Van now sells toys that can be put in the toy box and a goat (which also comes with a milker), which may only be purchased in spring. Galen has moved, and now lives in a shack on hill beside Vesta's farm. Nina has died of natural causes and her grave is beside Galen's shack. Dr. Hardy now lives in Galen's old house, in which the protagonist can have a chance to meet him. Starting from this chapter, the protagonist may receive a cat from Romana if she is befriended, the toddler can be picked up and played with, a sentient plant named Tartan may be acquired if Takakura is befriended, an alarm clock may be obtained from Grant if he is befriended, ducks may show up at the protagonist's farm if a pond is owned, a sickle can be obtained from Dr. Hardy and a fishing pole from Galen if they are befriended, Grant may inform the protagonist that he now has a job in a city located outside of town, the protagonist may have the option to take a bath with the son and learn about the Harvest Goddess (who doesn't appear in the game) from the Harvest Sprites, Chris and Samantha can be seen having a conversation, and Daryl can be caught doing suspicious activities such as spying on the son, attempting to experiment on the protagonist's cows, and spying on Carter and Flora (whom he has a crush on). If Tartan is befriended, the protagonist can use him to create hybrid crops. Failing your married life will result in a divorce, which will cause the game to end.

This chapter was renamed to "A Birth" in Harvest Moon: A Wonderful Life Special Edition and the protagonist's child may be a daughter instead of a son. There will also be additional events that did not happen in the original version which the player can trigger.

Happy Harvesting
In this chapter, lasting three years, the protagonist's son has grown into a seven or eight-year-old and can no longer be picked up and played with. Hugh and Lumina's appearance have changed again and the protagonist's house and dig site have expanded. The son's future career may be swayed by befriending villagers with similar careers or giving him items obtained from other characters (if befriended) such as a drum from Gustafa, a music sheet from Lumina, and a necklace from Flora. Nami returns in this chapter (if the protagonist does not marry her). The protagonist can also buy a sentient teddy bear named Daa-chan from Van, who may be seen trying to steal food from the refrigerator or spending time with the son. At one point, Dr. Hardy can be seen talking to Mukumuku.

Happy Farm Life
In this chapter, lasting two years, the protagonist's son is a teenager and wants to be independent. The protagonist has aged, as have most people in the valley. His house is now even bigger. The son's career cannot be changed now without confusing him. The ruins have grown even larger, so you can dig a lot and make a good profit. The protagonist can also buy a flower pot from Van. If the protagonist befriends Cody, he may receive a sculpture from him starting from this chapter. New events can also be triggered, such as seeing Flora talking to Kate, learning about Muffy's past from Griffin (if the protagonist didn't marry her), and witnessing Sebastian confronting Mukumuku. 

To The Journey
In this chapter, lasting one year, the protagonist's son is now a young adult, and his wife has aged. The son's actions mirror the protagonist's from chapter one, such as harvesting and looking for a spouse. He may question this to the protagonist at one point. The ruins are even bigger. There is no possible way for the son's career choice to be changed now.

The Twilight
In this chapter, lasting one year, the protagonist and other villagers have aged again. The protagonist's son is now certain of his career and can no longer be swayed. The game ends with the protagonist's death, his family and some of the villagers (depending on whom he has befriended) mourning him, the son undergoing his career, and Takakura thinking to the protagonist's father about how Forget-Me-Not Valley fares after the protagonist's death.

Heaven Chapter
The heaven chapter can only be played in Harvest Moon: A Wonderful Life Special Edition. In this chapter, the player may play at any pace or chapter they wish. The protagonist gets his wife and son back, along with his money, animals, and crops.

Related games
An updated version called Oh! A Wonderful Life was released in Japan for the PlayStation 2 in November 2004. The English language version was called A Wonderful Life Special Edition and was released in late 2005. While very similar to the original version of A Wonderful Life, some extra items and events were added in addition to an updated soundtrack. The most notable changes were the ability to have a daughter, the ability to marry Lumina, and the ability to continue playing after death. On May 16, 2017, it was announced that a remake of the Special Edition was scheduled for the PS4 with a tentative 2017 release planned. The PlayStation 4 version of the game is said to have fixed most of the lag from the PlayStation 2, making the game more playable, added trophy support, better resolution and quality. However, some lag issues and little glitches still remain.

The girl version of Harvest Moon: A Wonderful Life, Harvest Moon: Another Wonderful Life, was released for the GameCube in the English-speaking world in July 2005. In this game, the player goes through the storyline of A Wonderful Life as a female character, and can court and marry one of three male NPCs, Marlin, Rock, and Gustafa. The game offers connectivity with the Game Boy Advance game Harvest Moon: More Friends of Mineral Town.

Harvest Moon DS, the first game in the Story of Seasons series to be released on the Nintendo DS, has the same setting and features most of the characters from A Wonderful Life.

Marvelous Interactive announced that it would be releasing a remade version of A Wonderful Life under the Story of Seasons name on June 27, 2023.

Reception

Harvest Moon: A Wonderful Life received largely positive reviews upon its initial GameCube release. IGN gave the title an "Impressive" 8 out of 10 rating, praising gameplay and lasting appeal while also noting its "monotonous" audio and upsetting lack of festivals. A Wonderful Life garnered an 8.7 rating from Ryan Davis of GameSpot. Echoing other reviews, Davis considered it "a fun and potentially addictive game that, if you let it, will gladly consume any free time you choose to give it." The publication went on to name it the best GameCube game of March 2004.

The Special Edition released for PlayStation 2 did not receive such strong praise. IGN Juan Castro gave it a score of 6/10 and remarked "The differences, including an increase in brides, choosing the gender of your child and the ability to play forever, make little difference. What does make a difference, though, is the drastic drop in framerate, increase in load times and muddy graphics." Official UK PlayStation 2 Magazine gave it a 7/10 rating.

References

External links

505 Games games
2003 video games
GameCube games
Story of Seasons games
Nintendo Switch games
PlayStation 2 games
PlayStation Network games
Video games developed in Japan
Video games with alternative versions
Games with GameCube-GBA connectivity
Single-player video games
Marvelous Entertainment games